Voskehat (also Romanized as Voskeat; formerly, Patr'inj) is a town in the Armavir Province of Armenia.

It has a population of 3,491 at the 2011 census, up from 2,369 at the 2001 census.

See also 
Armavir Province

References 

Populated places in Armavir Province